Greenville is an unincorporated community and census-designated place (CDP) in Logan County, West Virginia, United States. It was first listed as a CDP prior to the 2020 census.

Geography

References

Census-designated places in Logan County, West Virginia
Census-designated places in West Virginia
Unincorporated communities in Logan County, West Virginia
Unincorporated communities in West Virginia
Populated places on the Guyandotte River